This is a list of hospitals in Yerevan, the capital of Armenia. As of 2022, there are 46 hospitals operating in the city.
Beglaryan Medical Centre, 1920
Scientific Research Institute of Spa Treatment and Physical Medicine, 1930
Research Center of Maternal and Child Health Protection, 1931
Shengavit Medical Center, 1938
Heratsi Hospital Complex №1, 1940
Scientific Center of Traumatology and Orthopedics, 1946
National Center of Oncology named after V.A. Fanarjian, 1946
Professor R. Yeolyan Haematology Center, 1947
Nork Republican Infectious Clinical Hospital, 1956
Kanaker-Zeytun Maternity Hospital, 1958
Scientific Research Institute of Cardiology, 1961
Grigor Narekatsi Medical Center, 1962
Astghik Medical Center, 1965
Armenia Republican Medical Center, 1969
Scientific Medical Center of Dermatology and STD, 1969
Avan Mental Health Center, 1971
Aramyants Medical Center, 1972
Mickaelyan Institute of Surgery, 1974
ArtMed Medical Rehabilitation Center, 1976
Sergey Malayan's Eye Center, 1978
Sourb Astvatsamayr Medical Center, 1982
Erebouni Medical Center, 1983
Izmirlian Medical Center, 1986
Yerevan Anti-tuberculosis Dispensary, 1987
Saint Astvatsatsin Maternity Hospital, 1992
Republican Pediatric Rehabilitation Center, 1992
Cross Health Center, 1992
Republican Institute of Reproductive Health, Perinatology, Obstetrics and Gynaelogy, 1993
Nork-Marash Medical Center, 1994
Arabkir Joint Medical Center and Institute of Child and Adolescent Health, 1995
ArBeS Healthcare Center for Rehabilitation, 1999
Armenicum Clinical Center, 1999
Yerevan Endocrinological Dispensary, 1999
Kanaker-Zeytun Medical Center, 2003
Vladimir Avagyan Medical Center, 2003
Nairi Medical Center, 2004
Surb Grigor Lusavorich Medical Center, 2004
Yerevan Medical Center, 2007
Avangard Medical Centre, 2011
SlavMed Medical Center, 2014
Elit-Med Medical Center, 2014
Wigmore Clinic Medical Center, 2015
National Centre for Mental Health Care
Muratsan Hospital Complex
Vitamed Medical Center, 2022
Center of recovery, preventive and traditional medicine Altmed, 2001

Yerevan

Hospitals
Yerevan